Events from the year 1690 in art.

Events
 Jean-Baptiste Monnoyer leaves France for England, where he produces a series of decorative panels for Montagu House, Bloomsbury.
 Approximate date – Dutch Golden Age artist Gerard de Lairesse goes blind due to congenital syphilis and gives up painting in favour of art theory.

Paintings

 Ludolf Bakhuizen – Ships in distress in raging storm (Rijksmuseum)
 Richard Brakenburgh – Peasant scenes
 Melchior d'Hondecoeter – De Menagerie (approx. date – Rijksmuseum)
 Hishikawa Moronobu – Beauty looking back
 Charles Le Brun – Adoration of the Shepherds
 Ricardo do Pilar – Christ in Martyrdom (Monastery of São Bento, Rio de Janeiro)
 Jan van Kessel the Younger – Noah and the Animals Entering the Ark
 Spinoza – Virgin del Carmen and the Child Jesus (Church of the Holy Kings, Metztitlán, Mexico; painting destroyed by fire 1998)
 Altarpiece of Strandebarm Church, Norway

Births
 January 22 – Nicolas Lancret, French painter (died 1743)
 September 23 – Giuseppe Bazzani, Italian Rococo painter (died 1769)
 probable
 Lorenzo Fratellini, Italian painter of miniature portraits (died 1729)
 Claes Lang, Finnish painter (died 1761)
 Philip Mercier, portrait painter (died 1760)
 Michael Ignaz Mildorfer, Austrian painter (died 1747)
 Ivan Nikitich Nikitin, Russian painter of portraits and battles (died 1741)
 Orazio Solimena, Italian painter (died 1789)

Deaths
 February 22 – Charles Le Brun, French painter (born 1619)
 March
 Bendix Grodtschilling, Danish painter and carpenter (born 1620)
 Abraham van Beijeren, Dutch painter (born 1620)
 March 17 – Jan van Mieris, Dutch painter (born 1660)
 April 25 – David Teniers the Younger, Flemish painter (born 1610)
 June 11 - Frederik Bloemaert, Dutch engraver (born c.1614)
 July 15 – Carlo Antonio Bussi, Swiss painter (born 1658)
 October 15
 Juan de Valdés Leal, Spanish painter (born 1622)
 Adam Frans van der Meulen, Flemish Baroque painter specializing in battle scenes (born 1632)
 date unknown
 Giacomo Barri,  Italian painter and printmaker (born unknown)
 Benjamin Block, German–Hungarian portrait painter (born 1631)
 Abraham Brueghel, Flemish painter from the famous Brueghel family of artists (born 1631)
 Antonio Castrejon, Spanish painter (born 1625)
 Tommaso Costa, Italian painter (born 1634)
 Giovanni Stefano Danedi, Italian painter of frescoes (born 1608/1612)
 Francesco di Maria, Italian painter active mainly in Naples (born 1623)
 Frederick Kerseboom, German painter (born 1632)
 Francesco Pianta, Italian sculptor (born 1634)
 Herman Verelst, Dutch Golden Age portrait and still life painter (born 1641)
 Yun Shouping, Chinese painter of the Qing dynasty (born 1633)
 probable
 Pietro Lucatelli, Italian painter active in Rome (born 1630)
 Wang Wu, Chinese painter and poet of the Qing Dynasty (born 1632)

 
Years of the 17th century in art
1690s in art